No Cause for Concern is the first studio album by Vice Squad. It was originally released in 1981 by Zonophone, a division of EMI. Although it wasn't released by Riot City Records the band decided to use the Riot City name as it was a label they founded. It was later re-released by Dojo with two bonus tracks and Captain Oi! with the same two bonus tracks and six more tracks.

Track listing 
 "Young Blood" (Shane Baldwin, Dave Bateman) – 2:42
 "Coward" (Bateman, Rebecca Bond) – 2:14
 "Nothing" (Bateman, Bond) – 1:34
 "Summer Fashion" (Bateman) – 3:04
 "1981" (Bateman, Bond) – 2:24
 "Saturday Night Special" (Baldwin, Bateman) – 2:48
 "Offering" (Bateman, Bond) – 1:38
 "The Times They Are a-Changin'" (Bob Dylan) – 1:59
 "Evil" (Bateman, Bond) – 3:16
 "Angry Youth" (Bateman) – 1:25
 "It's a Sell Out" (Bateman) – 1:54
 "Still Dying" (Bateman) – 1:49
 "Last Rockers" (Bateman, Bond) – 4:28

1993 Dojo/2000 Captain Oi! bonus tracks
 "(So) What for the 80's" (Bateman, Bond) – 2:09
 "Sterile" (Bateman, Bondage) – 2:39

2000 Captain Oi! additional bonus tracks
 "Last Rockers" (single version) (Bateman, Bondage) – 4:18
 "Living on Dreams" (Bateman) – 2:49
 "Latex Love" (Bateman) – 1:33
 "Resurrection" (Bateman) – 4:02
 "Young Blood" (Baldwin, Bateman) – 2:37
 "Humane" (single version) (Bateman) – 2:01

Bonus track origins
 Tracks 14 and 15 originally appeared on "Out of Reach" single
 Tracks 16–18 originally appeared on "Last Rockers" single
 Tracks 19–21 originally appeared on "Resurrection" single

Personnel
Vice Squad
 Beki Bondage – vocals
 Dave Bateman – guitar
 Mark Hambly – bass
 Shane Baldwin – drums

Release history

Vice Squad albums
1981 debut albums